Dominic Thiem was the defending champion, but lost to Andrey Rublev in the quarterfinals.

Rublev went on to win the title, defeating Lorenzo Sonego in the final, 6–4, 6–4.

Seeds

Draw

Finals

Top half

Bottom half

Qualifying

Seeds

Qualifiers

Lucky losers

Qualifying draw

First qualifier

Second qualifier

Third qualifier

Fourth qualifier

References

External Links
 Main Draw
 Qualifying Draw

Erste Bank Open - Singles
2020 Singles
Erste Bank Open Singles